Formula 1: Drive to Survive is a documentary series produced in a collaboration between Netflix and Formula One, to give a behind-the-scenes look at the drivers and races of the Formula One World Championship.

The first season covering the 2018 World Championship premiered on 8 March 2019, the second season covering the 2019 World Championship premiered on 28 February 2020, and the third season covering the 2020 World Championship premiered on 19 March 2021. A fourth season covering the 2021 World Championship was premiered on 11 March 2022. On 5 May 2022, the series was renewed for a fifth and a sixth season.

The fifth season of the series, focusing on the 2022 season, was released on 24 February 2023, prior to the training seasons and the start of the 2023 championship and the opening race, the Bahrain Grand Prix.

Premise

Season 1: 2018 World Championship
The 10-part series is the "first to truly immerse the audience inside the cockpits, the paddock and the lives of the key players in Formula 1". The series covers the 2018 Formula One World Championship and has "unparalleled and exclusive access to the world's fastest drivers, team principals and owners, as well as Formula 1's own management team".

Season 2: 2019 World Championship
The 10-part series covers the 2019 Formula One World Championship and included every team, including Ferrari and Mercedes who had not allowed Netflix to cover their teams in the first season. The second season covered Daniel Ricciardo and Nico Hulkenberg's misfortunes at Renault, Pierre Gasly's chaotic year which culminated in his demotion to Toro Rosso, the Belgian Grand Prix weekend, which had just seen the death of Formula 2 driver Anthoine Hubert during the feature race, and Haas F1 Team's new sponsors in Rich Energy and their lack of success on track.

Season 3: 2020 World Championship
The third season of the show, covering the 2020 Formula One World Championship, premiered on 19 March 2021 and continued some drivers' stories from the previous season, such as Daniel Ricciardo's dissatisfaction at Renault and Pierre Gasly's attempts to regain his lost seat at Red Bull. It also covered the effects of the COVID-19 pandemic on the season, Scuderia Ferrari's struggle to remain competitive following the power unit controversy of the previous year, and Romain Grosjean's serious crash at the Bahrain Grand Prix.

Season 4: 2021 World Championship 
Season 4 which documents the 2021 Formula One World Championship premiered on Netflix on 11 March 2022. This season covers the fierce title battle of that season between seven-time champion Lewis Hamilton and Dutch driver Max Verstappen.

Season 5: 2022 World Championship
Season 5 documents the 2022 Formula One World Championship and was released on 24 February 2023. This season covers the trials and tribulations of the Scuderia Ferrari, the porpoising issue of the Mercedes W13, the path leading up to Sergio Pérez' win at the Monaco Grand Prix, the controversy surrounding Oscar Piastri's contract dispute, and Daniel Ricciardo's struggles at McLaren. Red Bull driver Max Verstappen confirmed that Season 5 marks his first full appearance within in-show interviews, having criticized it in the past for fabricating events that happened during the World Championships.

Episodes

Season 1 (2019)

Season 2 (2020)

Season 3 (2021)

Season 4 (2022)

Season 5 (2023)

Production and concept 
On 24 March 2018, Formula One announced that Netflix had commissioned a ten episode docu-series giving an exclusive behind the scenes look at the 2018 Formula One World Championship. On 24 July 2019, Formula One announced that a second season would premiere in 2020 covering the 2019 Formula One World Championship, involving all 10 teams.

The series is executively produced by James Gay-Rees and Paul Martin for the production company, Box to Box Films. Sophie Todd is the production's showrunner.

Gay-Rees subsequently went on to reveal to The Fast Lane Podcast that Drive to Survive had originally been conceived as a series revolving solely around Red Bull Racing before it evolved into a series about F1 in general.

Filming began for the 2020 season in March but was suspended until July due to the COVID-19 pandemic.

Release
The trailer for the first season was released on 20 February 2019, and on 8 March 2019 the series premiered on Netflix.

The trailer for the second season was released on 17 February 2020, and the season premiered on Netflix on 28 February 2020.

The trailer for the third season was released on 19 February 2021, and the season premiered on Netflix on 19 March 2021.

The trailer for the fourth season was released on 28 February 2022, and the season premiered on Netflix on 11 March 2022. Between 6 March 2022 and 20 March 2022, the series was watched for 57.03 million hours according to Netflix's top 10 list.

Reception 
The show has received recognition for the additional insight it offers fans, and is credited with attracting new audiences (particularly American) to the sport. The condensing of season-long themes into single-episode narratives has drawn praise for adapting "the natural drama of a racing season into a narrative that can encourage a fan to tune into the real thing."

However, Drive to Survive has been criticized for including fake or misplaced commentary and team radios, staging certain scenes, placing undue importance on test and practice sessions, and over-dramatizing or misrepresenting certain events and relationships within the Formula One paddock. The continued criticism from both audiences and drivers led to discussions between Netflix and team managers and between Formula One and drivers. 

Max Verstappen notably boycotted participating in interviews during seasons 2, 3, and 4 due to him believing that the show dramatized some drivers by portraying them as villians and that the show manufactured fake rivalries. However, Verstappen confirmed his participation in Season 5 after reaching an agreement with the showrunners of Drive to Survive to "keep it real".

Awards and nominations

Spin-offs
In 2020, a version of Drive to Survive was released on F1 TV based around the 2019 Formula 2 Championship, called Chasing the Dream. Subsequent second and third seasons were produced, each covering the 2020 Formula 2 Championship and the 2021 Formula 2 Championship, premiering in 2021 and 2022 respectively.

References

External links

 
 

2010s American documentary television series
2018 in Formula One
2019 American television series debuts
2019 in Formula One
2020 in Formula One
2020s American documentary television series
2021 in Formula One
2022 in Formula One
Documentary television series about sports
English-language Netflix original programming
Formula One mass media
Netflix original documentary television series